Chloe Webb (born June 25, 1956) is an American actress, best known for her roles in the films Sid and Nancy (1986), The Belly of an Architect (1987), Twins (1988), and Heart Condition (1990). She also was nominated for a Primetime Emmy Award for her role as Laurette Barber in the ABC drama series China Beach, and had a recurring role as Monica Gallagher on the Showtime comedy-drama Shameless.

Early life
Webb was born June 25, 1956 in the Greenwich Village neighborhood of Manhattan in New York City. She spent her youth in various locations on the East Coast, depending on where her father, a bridge and road designer, was employed, though she was primarily raised in Syracuse, New York, where she attended Bishop Grimes High School. At age sixteen, she enrolled at The Boston Conservatory and later, Berklee College of Music. Originally, she pursued her passion for singing by singing in bars despite being underaged; she realized that even though she greatly enjoyed singing, she was better at acting.

Career 
In April 1982, Webb joined Forbidden Broadway, an Off-Broadway revue parodying musical theatre, particularly Broadway musicals. Four years later, she made her film debut in Alex Cox's Sid & Nancy (1986); she portrayed Nancy Spungen, the mentally ill, heroin-addicted girlfriend of punk rock singer Sid Vicious. Her performance garnered best actress awards from the National Society of Film Critics, the Boston Film Critics and the San Francisco Film Critics.

She also appeared as Brian Dennehy's estranged socialite girlfriend in  Peter Greenaway's 1987 drama film The Belly of an Architect and as Laurette, a young woman from Paoli, Pennsylvania who dreams of becoming a successful singer, in ABC's drama television series China Beach. Other roles include the eccentric girlfriend of Danny DeVito's character in the Ivan Reitman comedy Twins (1988), and a cameo as a woman convinced that she had been abducted by aliens in Ghostbusters II (1989). Between roles in motion pictures and television series, Webb frequently appeared in several Los Angeles based stage productions: The House of Blue Leaves, for which she won a Drama-Logue Award, and The Model Apartment; her performance earned her a Los Angeles Drama Critics Circle Award and another Drama-Logue Award.

Webb co-starred alongside Denzel Washington and Bob Hoskins in Heart Condition (1990). In 1991, she played a hairdresser in Queens Logic and a woman with a developmental disability who wins the lottery in ABC's made-for-TV film Lucky Day.

Other roles included the eccentric Mona Ramsey in the first season of Armistead Maupin miniseries Tales of the City (1993).

Webb has appeared on several television series: CBS's Judging Amy (2003), FOX's House (2005), CBS's Two and a Half Men (2005), NBC's Medium (2005), and CBS's CSI: Crime Scene Investigation (2008). Webb reunited with Cox in 2009 for his film Repo Chick; she played Sister Duncan.

Her most recent role was as Monica Gallagher, William H. Macy's character's estranged and unstable wife in Showtime's comedy-drama TV series Shameless; her performance earned her a nomination for Critics' Choice Television Award for Best Guest Performer in a Drama Series.

Partial filmography

References

External links
 

1956 births
Living people
American film actresses
American television actresses
People from Greenwich Village
Actresses from Syracuse, New York
Boston Conservatory at Berklee alumni
20th-century American actresses
21st-century American actresses